The 2018 Triglav osiguranje Radivoj Korać Cup was the 16th season of the Serbian men's national basketball cup tournament. The Žućko's left trophy awarded to the winner Partizan NIS from Belgrade.

Venue

Qualified teams

1 League table position after 13 rounds played

Draw 
The draw was held in Belgrade on 31 January 2018.

Bracket

Quarterfinals

FMP v Metalac

Crvena zvezda mts v Borac Čačak

Mega Bemax v Dynamic VIP PAY

Partizan NIS v Zlatibor

Semifinals

Crvena zvezda mts v FMP

Partizan NIS v Mega Bemax

Final

See also
2017–18 Basketball League of Serbia season
2017 ABA League Supercup
2017–18 Milan Ciga Vasojević Cup
Teams 
 2017–18 KK Crvena zvezda season
 2017–18 KK Partizan season

References

External links
 Competitions in Basketball Federation of Serbia 

Radivoj Korać Cup
Radivoj
Serbia